The Barbados women's national rugby union team are a national sporting side of Barbados, representing them at rugby union. The side first played in 2009.

History.

Results summary
(Full internationals only)

Results

Full internationals

See also
 Rugby union in Barbados

External links
 Rugby Barbados
 Barbados Rugby Football Union (BRFU)
 Barbados on IRB.com
 Barbados on rugbydata.com

Rugby Union
Rugby union in Barbados
Caribbean women's national rugby union teams